Soulicious is a 2011 studio album by Cliff Richard featuring duets with some of soul music's most respected names. Guest artists include Freda Payne, Dennis Edwards from the Temptations, Candi Staton, Percy Sledge, Roberta Flack, Deniece Williams, Brenda Holloway, Marilyn McCoo and Billy Davis Jr from the 5th Dimension, Russell Thompkins Jr from the Stylistics, Billy Paul and Peabo Bryson.

The album was produced by Motown songwriters and producers Lamont Dozier and husband and wife duo Nickolas Ashford and Valerie Simpson. It was recorded at several studios, in Memphis at both the Willie Mitchell's Royal Studios and Ardent Studios (with Lamont Dozier producing), and in New York at Above Asia Studios (with Nickolas Ashford and Valerie Simpson producing).

The album is Richard's first album of primarily new songs since 2004's Something's Goin' On album, and also includes four covers. The album reached number 10 on the UK Albums Chart and was certified silver in the UK.

Track listing

Charts

External links
 SoulMusic.com Interview: Sir Cliff Richard with David Nathan: The album Soulicious

References

Cliff Richard albums
2011 albums
EMI Records albums